Caryocolum trinella is a moth of the family Gelechiidae. It was described from Armenia.

This species was stated to be closely related to Caryocolum petryi. The single type is lost, since the whereabouts of the Fuchs collection is unknown.

References

Moths described in 1903
trinella
Moths of Asia